Northern Ndebele may refer to:
Northern Ndebele people, a Bantu nation and ethnic group in Southern Africa
Northern Ndebele language, an African language

Language and nationality disambiguation pages